Tyron Hirantha Wijewardene (born 29 August 1961), is a former Sri Lankan cricketer and umpire, elected to the International Panel of Umpires and Referees as Sri Lanka's second umpire.

As a cricketer, Wijewardene was a left-handed bowler, taking 9 wickets in his 5 First-class appearances for Saracens Sports Club in 1990/91. He was also a useful lower order batsman, getting one half-century having batted in just 5 innings.

Following an early retirement from cricket, he began umpiring and has stood in both Test cricket and One Day Internationals; standing in two matches during the 2003 Cricket World Cup.

See also
 List of Test cricket umpires
 List of One Day International cricket umpires
 List of Twenty20 International cricket umpires

References

1961 births
Living people
Sri Lankan cricketers
Saracens Sports Club cricketers
Sri Lankan Test cricket umpires
Sri Lankan One Day International cricket umpires
Sri Lankan Twenty20 International cricket umpires